Pelotomaculum thermopropionicum is an anaerobic, thermophilic, syntrophic propionate-oxidizing bacterium, the type species of its genus. The type strain is strain SI(T) (= DSM 13744T = JCM 10971T).

References

Further reading

External links
LPSN

Bacteria cooperate to survive: Pelotomaculum thermopropionicum
Type strain of Pelotomaculum thermopropionicum at BacDive -  the Bacterial Diversity Metadatabase

Peptococcaceae
Bacteria described in 2002
Thermophiles